The Warren Landing Lower Range Lights are a pair of range lights in Warren Landing, Manitoba, at the entrance to the Nelson River. Built in 1908, the lighthouses help to guide ship traffic from Lake Winnipeg into the river. They work in tandem with the Warren Landing Upper Range Lights.

Both lights of the range were originally square, pyramidal frame towers; at some point the rear tower was replaced by a skeletal tower, which still survives.  The range is still active, and is one of the remotest light stations in Canada.

See also
 List of lighthouses in Manitoba
 List of lighthouses in Canada

References

External links
 Aids to Navigation Canadian Coast Guard
Lighthouse Database page, with picture of front tower

Lighthouses completed in 1908
Lighthouses in Manitoba
Lake Winnipeg
1908 establishments in Manitoba